Augusto Aguilera Fócil is an Ecuadorian-American actor, best known for his roles in The Predator and Too Old To Die Young.

Life and career
Aguilera grew up in Los Angeles, California, and began his serious acting career at the Actors Circle Theatre when he was twenty. He eventually made the transition to acting on film which he found "strange" to begin with. "I’ve heard that theatre is an actor’s medium, film a director’s, TV a writer’s. Initially, I believed collaboration only came in film and theatre. Now I know it’s on the director...With theatre there are no safety nets. It’s an emotional marathon." He joined the cast of Chasing Life and made an appearance in Snowfall. In 2018, Aguilera co-starred in The Predator, opposite big-name stars such as Sterling K. Brown, Boyd Holbrook, Trevante Rhodes, Keegan-Michael Key and Olivia Munn. His character, Nettles, was described as the pop"heart" of the team. Aguilera stated that he would watch and roleplay the original Predator film.

Filmography

Film

Television

References

External links

Living people
Hispanic and Latino American male actors
Ecuadorian actors
American television actors
1986 births